The Crossing is a 2020 documentary film directed by Colombian filmmaker Juliana Peñaranda-Loftus. The documentary focuses on the Venezuelan refugee crisis, particularly at the Colombia-Venezuela border and in Cúcuta.

Synopsis 
The documentary starts with the 2019 humanitarian aid delivery attempt across the Colombia-Venezuela border and continues following the story of the Venezuelan refugee crisis, one of the largest migration crises in Latin America and the world, told by refugees and activists in Cúcuta, Colombia.

Reception 
The film was included the Vancouver International Film Festival, the St. Louis International Film Festival, the Bangkok International Film Festival and Holly Shorts 2020 official selection. The documentary was also considered as a candidate for the 94th Academy Awards for the Best Documentary (Short Subject) category.

See also 

 Bolivarian Revolution in film

References

External links 
 Official website
 

2000s Spanish-language films
Films shot in Colombia
2020 documentary films
2020 films
Documentary films about Venezuela
Colombian documentary films